Augusto Andaveris Iriondo (born 5 May 1979 in the Chicaloma, La Paz Department) is a Bolivian football striker who currently plays for Club Always Ready.

Club career
Andaveris was one of the team leaders responsible for qualifying La Paz to the Copa Libertadores 2008. In March 2008, he was invited to try out with Shandong Luneng Taishan F.C. of China, which plays in the Chinese Super League. However, the parties were not able to agree on commercial terms.  Therefore, Andaveris returned to La Paz F.C. in April 2008.  After eighteen games in Apertura 2008 (of which Andaveris missed four games), Andaveris has scored ten goals.  He has had four games in which he scored two goals in the same game.

His former clubs are Club Bolívar, Universidad Iberoamericana, Club Jorge Wilstermann, Club San José, Oriente Petrolero, Albanian club SK Tiranë, Inter Baku from Azerbaijan, as well as, a second spell at Club Bolívar.

International career
Between 2001 and 2012, Andaveris has been capped for the Bolivia national team in twenty games with three goals scored.

References

VIDEO Highlights of La Paz FC defeat of Club San Jose, 5-2 on April 27, 2008 (Augusto Andaveris scores two goals) 
Augusto Andaveris vuelve à la titularidad de La Paz FC 
Los goles de Augusto se van al futbol chino 
VIDEO of Andaveris scoring two goals against Wilstermann on March 2, 2008 
VIDEO of Andaveris scoring two goals against San Jose January 24, 2008

External links
 
 

1979 births
Afro-Bolivian people
Living people
People from Sud Yungas Province
Association football forwards
Bolivian footballers
Bolivia international footballers
Club Bolívar players
C.D. Jorge Wilstermann players
Club San José players
Oriente Petrolero players
KF Tirana players
La Paz F.C. players
Shamakhi FK players
Club Real Potosí players
Club Aurora players
2007 Copa América players
Bolivian expatriate footballers
Expatriate footballers in Albania
Expatriate footballers in Azerbaijan
Club Always Ready players